The 2000 NCAA Division III Men's Ice Hockey Tournament was the culmination of the 1999–00 season, the 17th such tournament in NCAA history. It concluded with Norwich defeating St. Thomas in the championship game 2-1. All Quarterfinals matchups were held at home team venues, while all succeeding games were played in Superior, Wisconsin.

The NCAA began offering automatic bids to conference tournament champions for the first time. Seven of the eight existing conferences received automatic bids with only the MCHA not included. This was because the MCHA had a Division II program who participated in their conference tournament; both ECAC East and ECAC Northeast had Division II members as well but none of those team participated in their respective conference tournaments. This allowed the results to be certified as Division III.

With the NESCAC now sponsoring ice hockey as a sport and holding an individual conference tournament, the conference rules limiting member schools to only one postseason tournament were dropped.

Despite being in Division III since 1973, ECAC Northeast received its first entry into the national tournament.

Qualifying teams
The following teams qualified for the tournament. Automatic bids were offered to the conference tournament champion of seven different conferences with one at-large bid for the best remaining team. No formal seeding was used while quarterfinal matches were arranged so that the road teams would have the shortest possible travel distances.

Format
The tournament featured three rounds of play. In the Quarterfinals, teams played a two-game series where the first team to reach 3 points was declared a winner (2 points for winning a game, 1 point each for tying). If both teams ended up with 2 points after the first two games a 20-minute mini-game used to determine a winner. Mini-game scores are in italics.  Beginning with the Semifinals all games became Single-game eliminations. The winning teams in the semifinals advanced to the National Championship Game with the losers playing in a Third Place game. The teams were seeded according to geographic proximity in the quarterfinals so the visiting team would have the shortest feasible distance to travel.

Bracket

Note: * denotes overtime period(s)Note: Mini-games in italics

Record by conference

References

External links
Division III Men's Ice Hockey Record Book

 
NCAA Division III ice hockey